Cynthia Lee Almond is an American attorney and politician serving as a member of the Alabama House of Representatives from the 63rd district. She assumed office on October 20, 2021.

Education 
Almond earned a Bachelor of Arts degree in history and Spanish from the University of Alabama and a Juris Doctor from the University of Alabama School of Law.

Career 
Almond has operated an independent law firm since 2008. From 2005 to 2021, she served as a member of the Tuscaloosa City Council from the first district. Almond later worked as a dean of the University of Alabama School of Law. She was elected to the Alabama House of Representatives in 2021, succeeding Bill Poole.

References 

Living people
Alabama lawyers
Members of the Alabama House of Representatives
University of Alabama alumni
University of Alabama School of Law alumni
Year of birth missing (living people)